The 2001 Arkansas vs. Ole Miss football game was a college football game played on November 3, 2001, between the University of Arkansas Razorbacks and the University of Mississippi Rebels; it broke a then–NCAA record for the longest football game ever played. The game included seven overtime periods, one of five games to ever do so. The lead went back and forth, with Ole Miss leading in the first quarter. The game was tied at halftime, and in the third quarter Arkansas gained a lead that Ole Miss would not get back until the fourth overtime.  The game ended in the seventh overtime period when Ole Miss quarterback Eli Manning failed to complete a pass on a two-point conversion play.

Before the game

Arkansas

The Arkansas Razorbacks entered the game 4–3, led by 4th-year head coach Houston Nutt. They opened their season on a Thursday night, beating UNLV in Little Rock 14–10. The Razorbacks then dropped three straight SEC contests, first to No. 8 Tennessee, 3–13. Following a week off due to the September 11 attacks, the 1–1 Razorbacks then lost to Alabama and Georgia, both on the road. The Hogs won their homecoming game the next week, beating Weber State 42–19. Now 2–3, Arkansas upset No. 9 South Carolina, and, following their bye week, upset No. 17 Auburn. Those two wins put them at 4–3 going into their contest with Ole Miss.

Ole Miss

The Ole Miss Rebels entered the game 6–1 under 3rd-year head coach David Cutcliffe. They opened their season with a win at home against Murray State, but dropped their first SEC game on the road to Auburn. Following a 21-day break, the Rebels returned to the field and defeated Kentucky for their first conference win of the season. The Rebels then rose to 3–1 following a road win at Arkansas State. Ole Miss then returned home to face Alabama and Middle Tennessee, defeating them both. In their last game before playing Arkansas, Ole Miss beat LSU on the road, 35–24, to post a 6–1 record.

Game summary

Game information

Scoring summary

Source

Game statistics
Source

Team statistics

Game leaders

See also
2003 Arkansas vs. Kentucky football game – the second game to feature seven overtimes
2006 North Texas vs. FIU football game – the third game to go to seven overtimes, and the first such non-SEC game
2017 Western Michigan vs. Buffalo football game – the fourth game to go to seven overtimes
2018 LSU vs. Texas A&M football game – the fifth and most recent game to reach seven overtimes
2021 Illinois vs. Penn State football game - the first game to feature nine overtimes

References

2001 Southeastern Conference football season
vs. Ole Miss 2001
vs. Arkansas 2001
November 2001 sports events in the United States
2001 in sports in Mississippi